Ramsey and Parkeston (formerly just Ramsey) is a civil parish in the Tendring district, in the county of Essex, England. The parish includes the villages of Ramsey and Parkeston. In 2011 the parish had a population of 2343. The parish touches Arwarton, Great Oakley, Harkstead, Harwich, Little Oakley, Wix and Wrabness. There are 13 listed buildings in Ramsey and Parkeston.

History 
On 12 January 1979 it was renamed from "Ramsey" to "Ramsey and Parkeston".

References

External links 
 Parish council

Civil parishes in Essex
Tendring